Eugene Allen Gilmore (July 4, 1871 – November 4, 1953) was Vice Governor-General of the Philippine Islands from 1922 to 1929, serving twice as acting Governor-General of the Philippines in 1927 and again in 1929. He also held positions as the Dean of the College of Law at the University of Iowa from 1930 to 1934, the twelfth President of the University of Iowa from 1934 to 1940, and the law dean at the University of Pittsburgh School of Law from 1940 to 1942.

Biography 
Gilmore was born in Brownville, Nebraska to Andrew Gilmore and Sarah Jane Allen Hall. He received his B.A. degree from DePauw University in 1893, and his LL.B. from Harvard in 1899. He married Blanche Bayse of Rockport, Indiana on December 27, 1899. After practicing law in Boston, Massachusetts from 1899 to 1902, Gilmore served as faculty at the University of Wisconsin Law School from 1902 to 1922. While in Madison, he commissioned Frank Lloyd Wright to design a home, the Eugene A. Gilmore House.  He was the Vice Governor-General of the Philippine Islands from 1922 to 1929. 

Gilmore died of a heart attack at his home in Iowa City, Iowa on November 4, 1953.

Legacy 
Gilmore Avenue, Quezon City, a major thoroughfare in the Metro Manila, is named after him, in turn lending its name to Gilmore station, an urban mass transit station located near the avenue. Gilmore Hall at the University of Iowa is named for him.

References

External links
 

1871 births
1953 deaths
People from Brownville, Nebraska
Governors-General of the Philippine Islands
American expatriates in the Philippines
History of the Philippines (1898–1946)
DePauw University alumni
Harvard Law School alumni
University of Wisconsin–Madison faculty
University of Pittsburgh faculty
Presidents of the University of Iowa
University of Iowa College of Law faculty
American lawyers
American academic administrators